Seyhun or Seyhoun may refer to:
Seuhun, Arabic name of Syr Darya river 
Hooshang Seyhoun,  Iranian architect, sculptor, painter, scholar and professor
Massoumeh Seyhoun, Iranian artist, founder of Seyhoun Gallery, Tehran
Seyhun Topuz, Turkish sculptor.
Seyhoun Gallery, Tehran, art gallery in Iran
Seyhoun Gallery, Los Angeles, art gallery in USA

See also
Seyhan (disambiguation)